Thomas Burgh may refer to:

 Thomas Burgh of Gainsborough (c. 1431–1496), English peer and High Sheriff of Lincolnshire 1460
 Thomas Burgh, 1st Baron Burgh (c. 1488–1550), English peer and 5th Baron Strabolgi
 Thomas Burgh, 3rd Baron Burgh (c. 1558–1597), English peer, 7th Baron Strabolgi, Lord Deputy of Ireland 1597
 Thomas Burgh (1670–1730) or Thomas de Burgh, Irish military engineer, architect, MP and Surveyor General of Ireland
 Thomas Burgh (Lanesborough MP) (1696–1758), Anglo-Irish politician and MP
 Thomas Burgh (died 1759) (1707–1759), Irish politician and MP
 Thomas Burgh (1754–1832), Irish politician and MP
 Thomas Burgh (MP died 1810), Irish politician and MP for Kilbeggan, Clogher and Fore
 Thomas Burgh (priest) (1786–1845), Dean of Cloyne

See also
 Burgh (surname)
 de Burgh, surname
 DeBerg, surname